Henry J. Meade (August 8, 1925 – June 22, 2006) was Chief of Chaplains of the United States Air Force. Born in Brookline, Massachusetts in 1925, Meade was an ordained Roman Catholic priest. He graduated from Saint Anselm College and Saint John's Seminary. Meade died on June 22, 2006.

Career
Meade joined the United States Air Force in 1957. After serving at various locations around the world, he was assigned to The Pentagon in 1969. In 1972, he was named Deputy Chief of Chaplains of the United States Air Force with the rank of brigadier general. He was promoted to Chief of Chaplains and achieved the rank of major general in 1974. Meade remained Chief of Chaplains until his retirement in 1978.

Awards he received include the Legion of Merit, the Bronze Star Medal, the Air Force Commendation Medal with three oak leaf clusters and the Outstanding Unit Award.

See also

References

People from Brookline, Massachusetts
United States Air Force generals
Chiefs of Chaplains of the United States Air Force
Recipients of the Legion of Merit
Saint Anselm College alumni
Saint John's Seminary (Massachusetts) alumni
1925 births
2006 deaths
Catholics from Massachusetts
20th-century American Roman Catholic priests
Military personnel from Massachusetts